Qaṣabah 'Ajlūn is one of the districts  of Ajloun governorate, Jordan.

References 

Districts of Jordan